Pedraza is a municipality in Spain, located in the province of Segovia in the autonomous community of Castile and León. It is located at 37 km northeast of the city of Segovia with a population of less than 500.

Every year in July, Pedraza holds the Concierto de las Velas festival during La Noche de las Velas. Residents of the town and surrounding cities light candles along the streets and residences. In the city center multiple concerts are held featuring varying types of Spanish classical music. See La Noche de las Velas (in Spanish).

Galery

References

External links 
Official website of Pedraza
Tour in Pedraza (Spanish)

Municipalities in the Province of Segovia
Populated places in the Province of Segovia
Cultural tourism in Spain